"Chuck Versus the Ring" is the second season finale of Chuck, which aired on April 27, 2009. The day of Ellie and Devon's wedding arrives, but Chuck finds himself forced to protect both his sister and the event from a vengeful Ted Roark.

The title of the episode is a double entendre, referencing both the wedding rings, and the Ring, introduced in this episode, who are the main antagonists of season 3.

Plot synopsis
The episode begins as Chuck and Casey quit the Buy More. At Castle, Beckman offers Chuck a position as an analyst on the ongoing Intersect project, which Chuck declines. Beckman informs Casey that he can rejoin his Special Forces unit, but asks Sarah to stay behind a moment. Upstairs, Chuck receives an extremely large sum of money from the government in exchange for the work he did for them. Casey gives Chuck his personal number if he ever needs anything, and for the first time tells Chuck he's done a good job after the two share an awkward hug. Back down in Castle, Beckman reassigns Sarah to the Intersect project alongside Bryce Larkin, who is now at Castle. They are due to head to Zurich the next morning.

At the church on the day of the wedding, Chuck tells Ellie he quit the Buy More. Ellie is proud of him and tells him to follow his dreams. He tracks down Sarah, who is going over her part in the wedding with Honey Woodcomb and asks her to go away with him on a vacation. However, Sarah breaks the news that she's leaving the next day with Bryce. Chuck leaves and takes a bottle of wine with him from the dining hall where the reception will be held, but before he can start drinking he discovers two dead caterers stashed under a table. Roark arrives and demands the Intersect, or else he will kill Ellie. Chuck goes to warn Sarah, but Morgan intercepts him first. Chuck tells Morgan to stall, and to specifically deliver a message to Sarah that he forgot the rings, as she saw them earlier. Morgan does as he asks, immediately alerting Sarah that something is wrong. She tells Morgan to continue his attempt to stall the wedding, then finds Roark and a Fulcrum team assembling. Chuck heads back to Castle to recover the Intersect cube but Bryce warns him it's already been moved and reveals he has known about Orion, Chuck's father, for some time now. When Chuck tells him Ellie's life is in danger, Bryce decides to offer himself up as bait. Chuck also leaves Casey a message at his personal number.

Morgan delays the wedding by having Jeff and Lester perform before the ceremony (which Devon allows after Morgan tells him the instructions came from Chuck). Chuck arrives as Sarah is searching for a weapon, and Bryce offers himself up as the "Human Intersect." Roark still intends on killing the wedding party and a gunfight breaks out, with Sarah using knives from one of the gifts as a weapon. They are pinned down and out of ammunition and they are about to be killed by Roark when Casey's special forces team parachutes through the glass ceiling into the dining hall to save Chuck, Sarah and Bryce. Before anyone notices the commotion, Jeffster!'s rendition of "Mr. Roboto" ends with a fireworks display that sets off the sprinkler systems, destroying the ceremony but sparing Chuck from devising an explanation for Ellie. As Roark tries to escape, Stephen punches him, then Casey and his team take Roark back to Castle and set up a temporary base in the facility.

Chuck is upset that his spy life has again damaged his private life. He realizes, however, that he can use his government pay to set things right, and with Sarah and Casey's help, quickly plans the beach-side wedding that Ellie had really wanted the entire time. He confesses to Ellie that having Morgan stall was his idea and not to blame Morgan, and convinces her to trust him. The second wedding goes off without a hitch. During the ceremony, as Bryce watches from the beach, he realizes that Sarah does not intend to go with him, which she confirms. At Castle, Miles, one of Casey's men, murders both Roark and Casey's team but spares Casey because Casey had previously saved his life. Casey assumes he's Fulcrum, but before knocking him out, the man says he is not Fulcrum. At the reception, Bryce approaches Stephen, who warns him to leave his son alone and asks him about changes he made to the new Intersect. Bryce tells him he does not want to know. He leaves with a man posing as a government agent. However, Stephen quickly flashes on the man, who was presumed dead in the intelligence in Stephen's head. While Chuck and Sarah dance, Sarah tells him that he is a real hero and begins to confess her true feelings for him but is interrupted by Stephen as he warns them about the man who took Bryce. Sarah figures that if the spies knew about Bryce, they must also know about Casey, so she rushes to try to save both Bryce and Casey. Chuck begins to rush after her when his father tries to stop him on the grounds that Chuck is no longer a spy. Chuck protests and says that he has to go because he loves Sarah, so Stephen agrees and gives him his wrist computer to help Chuck find Sarah and the others. At Castle, Chuck intercepts Sarah and Casey, and demands that, although he is no longer a spy, he's uniquely needed. Sarah and Casey concede and the three go to help Bryce.

At the building where the Intersect is stored, Bryce discovers the ambush and escapes into the vault. The team arrives shortly after and engages in a firefight. Chuck uses his father's computer to gain access to the Intersect, where he finds Bryce with a fatal gunshot wound. Bryce warns him the Intersect is too powerful and must be destroyed. Chuck tries to tell Bryce that the Intersect is needed to fight Fulcrum, but Bryce tells Chuck that Fulcrum does not matter, that they are only one part of the Ring.  He asks Chuck to take care of Sarah before dying. Chuck turns to the Intersect, torn between destroying it or downloading. After flashing back on several previous moments, illustrating why he was sent the Intersect in the first place, Chuck downloads the new system into his head. Chuck then triggers a power surge that destroys the system and also disables the security system protecting the chamber. Miles and his men enter with Sarah and Casey as prisoners and prepare to kill them in front of Chuck. As he takes aim, Chuck flashes and instantly learns kung fu, then effortlessly defeats all five hostiles, revealing that the new Intersect is able to impart physical skills as well as information.

As Sarah and Casey stare at Chuck (who is, himself, recovering from a state of shock) in surprise and disbelief, the episode ends with Chuck saying "Guys, I know kung fu" with the words "To Be Continued...".

Production
"Chuck Versus the Ring" addressed many plot points that appeared throughout the series to that point. Most significantly, Chuck learns the reasons Bryce Larkin originally sent him the Intersect in the opening of the series. The episode revealed a pre-existing relationship between Bryce Larkin and Stephen Bartowski/Orion. Some time before the events in the pilot and after Bryce got Chuck kicked out of Stanford, Orion learned about Bryce's actions in protecting his son and came to view him as the only spy he could trust. Their interactions are not explicitly mentioned. However, Bryce learned enough about Orion to come to respect him and to view him as a hero. Bryce goes against Orion's wishes of not involving Chuck and sends the Intersect to him, knowing his former college friend could handle it and saying he deserved to know the truth about his father's disappearance when he was a child. It also brought an end to the Fulcrum Intersect arc that dominated the second half of the season, as well as the minor arc concerning the wedding of Ellie and Devon.

A major concern of Chris Fedak and Josh Schwartz was that audiences would mistake the previous episode for the season finale, however Fedak described "Chuck Versus the Ring" as a "cataclysmic bit of action-comedy," and promised that it would be even bigger than "Chuck Versus the Colonel." The ending had been planned from the earliest stages of the second season's development, and much of the mythology that was revealed throughout the final episodes of the season had been in existence from the initial planning of the series in 2007.

When preparing to film the fight scene between Chuck and The Ring agents, Schwartz and Fedak were unsure whether to employ a stuntman or actually use Levi during the shoot. Only after giving Levi a chance to work with the stunt choreographer and seeing what they had worked up did they decide to use as much of Levi in the scene as possible.

Production details
 In the Orange Orange, Chuck thanks Casey for saving his life "at least once a week," in reference to the show's weekly schedule.
 When Chuck enters the Intersect room, it is similar to Bryce Larkin's entrance to an Intersect room in the pilot.
 Chuck's flash in the Intersect room focuses on four pairs of Japanese kanji, each representing a different martial art: karate (空手), kyūdō (弓道), hakkō (几光), and kung fu (功夫).

Flashes
 Stephen flashes on the spy who arrives to take Bryce to the Intersect.
 In the Intersect room, Chuck flashes on images demonstrating how to do kung fu and proceeds to take out all of the hostile agents in the room.

Reception
Alan Sepinwall of the New Jersey Star-Ledger called the episode the best in the series. He particularly cited the scene of Jeffster!'s performance of "Mr. Roboto" set against the church shootout as containing "so much concentrated awesome that it might be illegal in certain states." IGN scored the episode a 9.3, finding it a bit choppy with multiple endings that caused the episode to seem to stop and start.

References to popular culture
 Jeff references Marty McFly's performance of "Johnny B. Goode" in Back to the Future when he says, "Watch me for the changes" to the wedding band.
 Captain Awesome's dad refers to Jeffster as "Sam Kinison and an Indian lesbian." Sam Kinison was a comedian whose appearance is similar to Jeff.
 After Chuck learned kung fu from the Intersect and defeated the enemy agents, he says "I know kung fu" in reference to The Matrix, where Neo says the same thing after "learning" kung fu in a similar manner.
 Devon's father, "Woody," who first appears in "Chuck versus the Sensei" is portrayed by Bruce Boxleitner. Boxleitner previously played the titular character in the film Tron, of which Chuck has a poster in his room, as well as being referenced in several previous episodes.

References

External links 
 

Ring
2009 American television episodes
Television episodes about weddings